The Technical Museum of the Empordà (Museu Tècnica de l'Empordà) is a technology museum in Figueres, Spain.

It opened on 27 June 2004, and is especially known for its superb collection of early and rare typewriters.

References

External links 
 

Technology museums in Spain
Museums in Girona
Buildings and structures in Figueres
Art museums established in 2004
2004 establishments in Spain